COVID-19 vaccine clinical research uses clinical research to establish the characteristics of COVID-19 vaccines. These characteristics include efficacy, effectiveness and safety. , 40 vaccines are authorized by at least one national regulatory authority for public use:
 one DNA vaccine: ZyCoV-D
 four RNA vaccines: Pfizer–BioNTech, Moderna, Walvax, and Gemcovac
 twelve inactivated vaccines: Chinese Academy of Medical Sciences, CoronaVac, Covaxin, CoviVac, COVIran Barekat, FAKHRAVAC, Minhai-Kangtai, QazVac, Sinopharm BIBP, WIBP, Turkovac, and VLA2001.
 six viral vector vaccines: Sputnik Light, Sputnik V, Oxford–AstraZeneca, Convidecia, Janssen, and iNCOVACC
 sixteen subunit vaccines: Abdala, Corbevax, COVAX-19, EpiVacCorona, IndoVac, MVC-COV1901, Noora, Novavax, Razi Cov Pars, Sanofi–GSK, Sinopharm CNBG, Skycovione, Soberana 02, Soberana Plus, V-01, and ZF2001.
 one virus-like particle vaccine: CoVLP

, 353 vaccine candidates are in various stages of development, with 135 in clinical research, including 38 in phase I trials, 32 in phase I–II trials, 39 in phase III trials, and 9 in phase IV development.

Formulation
A wide variety of technologies are being used to formulate vaccines against COVID-19. The development and deployment of mRNA vaccines and viral vector vaccines has been outstandingly rapid and can be described as revolutionary. However, global vaccine equity against COVID-19 has not been achieved. Conventional vaccine manufacturing approaches using whole inactivated virus (WIV), protein-based subunit vaccines, and virus-like particles (VLPs) may offer advantages in the development of vaccines for use in low- and middle-income countries (LMICs) and in addressing vaccine access gaps.

Many vaccine candidates use adjuvants to enhance immunogenicity, as part of the delivery system or as an accompanying immune stimulant. Vaccine adjuvant formulations using aluminum salts or "alum" may be particularly effective for technologies using inactivated COVID-19 virus and for recombinant protein-based or vector-based vaccines.

Status

Clinical trials 

The clinical trial process typically consists of three phases, each following the success of the prior phase. Trials are doubly blind in that neither the researcher nor the subject know whether they receive the vaccine or a placebo. Each phase involves randomly-selected subjects who are randomly assigned to serve either as recipients are controls:
 Phase I trials test primarily for safety and preliminary dosing in healthy subjects. Dozens of subjects.
 Phase II trials evaluate immunogenicity, dose levels (efficacy based on biomarkers) and adverse effects. Hundreds of subjects. Sometimes Phase I and II trials are combined.
 Phase III trials typically involve more participants at multiple sites, include a control group, and test effectiveness of the vaccine to prevent the disease (an "interventional" or "pivotal" trial), while monitoring for adverse effects at the selected dose. Safety, efficacy, and clinical endpoints may vary, including the definition of side effects, infection or amount of transmission, and whether the vaccine prevents moderate or severe infection.

A clinical trial design in progress may adopt an "adaptive design". If accumulating data provide insights about the treatment, the endpoints or other aspects or the trial can be adjusted. Adaptive designs may shorten trial durations and use fewer subjects, possibly expediting decisions, avoiding duplication of research efforts, and enhancing coordination of design changes.

Vaccine candidates in human trials
The table below shows various vaccine candidates and the phases which they had completed per the references. Current phases are also shown along with other details.

Homologous prime-boost vaccination 

In July 2021, the U.S. Food and Drug Administration (FDA) and the Centers for Disease Control and Prevention (CDC) issued a joint statement reporting that a booster dose is not necessary for those who have been fully vaccinated.

In August 2021, the FDA and the CDC authorized the use of an additional mRNA vaccine dose for immunocompromised individuals. The authorization was extended to cover other specific groups in September 2021.

In October 2021, the FDA and the CDC authorized the use of either homologous or heterologous vaccine booster doses.

Heterologous prime-boost vaccination 

The World Health Organization (WHO) defines heterologous prime-boost immunization as the "administration of two different vectors or delivery systems expressing the same or overlapping antigenic inserts." A heterologous scheme can sometimes be more immunogenic than some homologous schemes.

In October 2021, the FDA and the CDC authorized the use of either homologous or heterologous vaccine booster doses.

Some experts believe that heterologous prime-boost vaccination courses can boost immunity, and several studies have begun to examine this effect. Despite the absence of clinical data on the efficacy and safety of such heterologous combinations, Canada and several European countries have recommended a heterologous second dose for people who have received the first dose of the Oxford–AstraZeneca vaccine.

In February 2021, the Oxford Vaccine Group launched the Com-COV vaccine trial to investigate heterologous prime-boost courses of different COVID-19 vaccines. As of June 2021, the group is conducting two phase II studies: Com-COV and Com-COV2.

In Com-COV, the two heterologous combinations of the Oxford–AstraZeneca and Pfizer–BioNTech vaccines were compared with the two homologous combinations of the same vaccines, with an interval of 28 or 84 days between doses.

In Com-COV2, the first dose is the Oxford–AstraZeneca vaccine or the Pfizer vaccine, and the second dose is the Moderna vaccine, the Novavax vaccine, or a homologous vaccine equal to the first dose, with an interval of 56 or 84 days between doses.

A study in the UK is evaluating annual heterologous boosters by randomly combining the following vaccines: Oxford–AstraZeneca, Pfizer–BioNTech, Moderna, Novavax, VLA2001, CureVac, and Janssen.

On 16 December, WHO recommendations on heterologous vaccinations suggested a general trend of increased immunogenicity when one of the doses is of an mRNA vaccine, particularly as the last dose. The immunogenicity of a homologous mRNA course is roughly equivalent to a heterologous scheme involving a vector vaccine and an mRNA vaccine. However, the WHO has emphasized the need to address many evidence gaps in heterologous regimens, including duration of protection, optimal interval between doses, influence of fractional dosing, effectiveness against variants and long-term safety.

Efficacy

Vaccine efficacy is the reduction in risk of getting the disease by vaccinated participants in a controlled trial compared with the risk of getting the disease by unvaccinated participants. An efficacy of 0% means that the vaccine does not work (identical to placebo). An efficacy of 50% means that there are half as many cases of infection as in unvaccinated individuals.

COVID-19 vaccine efficacy may be adversely affected if the arm is held improperly or squeezed so the vaccine is injected subcutaneously instead of into the muscle. The CDC guidance is to not repeat doses that are administered subcutaneously.

It is not straightforward to compare the efficacies of the different vaccines because the trials were run with different populations, geographies, and variants of the virus. In the case of COVID-19 prior to the advent of the delta variant, it was thought that a vaccine efficacy of 67% may be enough to slow the pandemic, but the current vaccines do not confer sterilizing immunity, which is necessary to prevent transmission. Vaccine efficacy reflects disease prevention, a poor indicator of transmissibility of SARS‑CoV‑2 since asymptomatic people can be highly infectious. The US Food and Drug Administration (FDA) and the European Medicines Agency (EMA) set a cutoff of 50% as the efficacy required to approve a COVID-19 vaccine, with the lower limit of the 95% confidence interval being greater than 30%. Aiming for a realistic population vaccination coverage rate of 75%, and depending on the actual basic reproduction number, the necessary effectiveness of a COVID-19 vaccine is expected to need to be at least 70% to prevent an epidemic and at least 80% to extinguish it without further measures, such as social distancing.

The observed substantial efficacy of certain mRNA vaccines even after partial (1-dose) immunization indicates a non-linear dose-efficacy relation already seen in the phase I-II study.  It suggests that personalization of the vaccine dose (regular dose to the elderly, reduced dose to the healthy young, additional booster dose to the immunosuppressed) might allow accelerating vaccination campaigns in settings of limited supplies, thereby shortening the pandemic, as predicted by pandemic modeling.

Ranges below are 95% confidence intervals unless indicated otherwise, and all values are for all participants regardless of age, according to the references for each of the trials. By definition, the accuracy of the estimates without an associated confidence interval is unknown publicly. Efficacy against severe COVID-19 is the most important, since hospitalizations and deaths are a public health burden whose prevention is a priority. Authorized and approved vaccines have shown the following efficacies:

Effectiveness

Evidence from vaccine use during the pandemic shows vaccination can reduce infection and is most effective at preventing severe COVID-19 symptoms and death, but is less good at preventing mild COVID-19. Efficacy wanes over time but can be maintained with boosters. In 2021 the CDC reported that unvaccinated people were 10 times more likely to be hospitalized and 11 times more likely to die than fully vaccinated people.

CDC reported that vaccine effectiveness fell from 91% against Alpha to 66% against Delta. One expert stated that "those who are infected following vaccination are still not getting sick and not dying like was happening before vaccination." By late August 2021 the Delta variant accounted for 99 percent of U.S. cases and was found to double the risk of severe illness and hospitalization for those not yet vaccinated.

In November 2021, a study by the ECDC estimated that 470,000 lives over the age of 60 had been saved since the start of vaccination roll-out in the European region.

On 10 December 2021, the UK Health Security Agency reported that early data indicated a 20- to 40-fold reduction in neutralizing activity for Omicron by sera from Pfizer 2-dose vaccinees relative to earlier strains.

According to early December 2021 CDC data, "unvaccinated adults were about 97 times more likely to die from COVID-19 than fully vaccinated people who had received boosters".

A meta analysis looking into COVID-19 vaccine differences in immunosuppressed individuals found that people with a weakened immune system, are less able to produce neutralizing antibodies. For example, organ transplant recipients needing three vaccines to achieve seroconversion. A study on the serologic response to mRNA vaccines among patients with lymphoma, leukemia and myeloma found that one-quarter of patients did not produce measurable antibodies, varying by cancer type.

In February 2023, a systematic review in The Lancet said that the protection afforded by infection was comparable to that from vaccination, albeit with an increased risk of severe illness and death from the disease of an initial infection.

Studies
Real-world studies of vaccine effectiveness measure the extent to which a certain vaccine prevents infection, symptoms, hospitalization and death for the vaccinated individuals in a large population under routine conditions.
 In Israel, among the 715,425 individuals vaccinated by the mRNA vaccines from 20 December 2020, to 28 January 2021, starting seven days after the second shot, only 317 people (0.04%) displayed mild/moderate COVID-19 symptoms and only 16 people (0.002%) were hospitalized.
 CDC reported that under real-world conditions, mRNA vaccine effectiveness was 90% against infections regardless of symptom status; while effectiveness of partial immunization was 80%.
 In the UK, 15,121 health care workers from 104 hospitals who had tested negative for antibodies prior to the study, were followed by RT-PCR tests twice a week from 7 December 2020 to 5 February 2021, a study compared the positive results for the 90.7% vaccinated share of their cohort with the 9.3% unvaccinated share, and found that the Pfizer-BioNTech vaccine reduced all infections (including asymptomatic), by 72% (58–86%) three weeks after the first dose and 86% (76–97%) one week after the second dose, while Alpha was dominant.
 In Israel a study conducted from 17 January to 6 March 2021, found that Pfizer/BioNTech reduced asymptomatic Alpha infections by 94% and symptomatic COVID-19 infections by 97%.
 A study among pre-surgical patients across the Mayo Clinic system in the United States, showed that mRNA vaccines were 80% protective against asymptomatic infections.
 A UK study found that a single dose of the Oxford–AstraZeneca COVID-19 vaccine is about  effective in people aged 70 and older.
 A study finds that nearly all teenagers admitted to intensive care units because of COVID-19 were unvaccinated.

Pregnancy and fertility
Studies have not observed a correlation between COVID vaccination and fertility.

A UK study found COVID vaccination is safe for pregnant women and is associated with a 15% decrease in the odds of stillbirth. Vaccination is recommended for pregnant women because pregnancy increases the risk of severe COVID. Researchers at St George's, University of London, and the Royal College of Obstetricians and Gynaecologists investigated 23 published studies and trials involving 117,552 vaccinated pregnant women. There was no increased risk of complications during pregnancy. Almost all pregnant women admitted to UK hospitals with COVID were unvaccinated.

A US study of 46,079 pregnancies concluded that COVID vaccination is safe and does not raise the risk of preterm birth or small size babies.

Variants

The interplay between the SARS-CoV-2 virus and its human hosts was initially natural but is now being altered by the prompt availability of vaccines. The potential emergence of a SARS-CoV-2 variant that is moderately or fully resistant to the antibody response elicited by the COVID-19 vaccines may necessitate modification of the vaccines. The emergence of vaccine-resistant variants is more likely in a highly vaccinated population with uncontrolled transmission. Trials indicate many vaccines developed for the initial strain have lower efficacy for some variants against symptomatic COVID-19. , the US Food and Drug Administration believed that all FDA authorized vaccines remained effective in protecting against circulating strains of SARS-CoV-2.

Alpha (lineage B.1.1.7)

Limited evidence from various preliminary studies reviewed by the WHO indicated retained efficacy/effectiveness against disease from Alpha with the Oxford–AstraZeneca vaccine, Pfizer–BioNTech and Novavax, with no data for other vaccines yet. Relevant to how vaccines can end the pandemic by preventing asymptomatic infection, they have also indicated retained antibody neutralization against Alpha with most of the widely distributed vaccines (Sputnik V, Pfizer–BioNTech, Moderna, CoronaVac, Sinopharm BIBP, Covaxin), minimal to moderate reduction with the Oxford–AstraZeneca and no data for other vaccines yet.

In December 2020, a new SARS‑CoV‑2 variant, the Alpha variant or lineage B.1.1.7, was identified in the UK.

Early results suggest protection to the variant from the Pfizer-BioNTech and Moderna vaccines.

One study indicated that the Oxford–AstraZeneca COVID-19 vaccine had an efficacy of 42–89% against Alpha, versus 71–91% against other variants.

Preliminary data from a clinical trial indicates that the Novavax vaccine is ~96% effective for symptoms against the original variant and ~86% against Alpha.

Beta (lineage B.1.351)

Limited evidence from various preliminary studies reviewed by the WHO have indicated reduced efficacy/effectiveness against disease from Beta with the Oxford–AstraZeneca vaccine (possibly substantial), Novavax (moderate), Pfizer–BioNTech and Janssen (minimal), with no data for other vaccines yet. Relevant to how vaccines can end the pandemic by preventing asymptomatic infection, they have also indicated possibly reduced antibody neutralization against Beta with most of the widely distributed vaccines (Oxford–AstraZeneca, Sputnik V, Janssen, Pfizer–BioNTech, Moderna, Novavax; minimal to substantial reduction) except CoronaVac and Sinopharm BIBP (minimal to modest reduction), with no data for other vaccines yet.

Moderna has launched a trial of a vaccine to tackle the Beta variant or lineage B.1.351. On 17 February 2021, Pfizer announced neutralization activity was reduced by two-thirds for this variant, while stating that no claims about the efficacy of the vaccine in preventing illness for this variant could yet be made. Decreased neutralizing activity of sera from patients vaccinated with the Moderna and Pfizer-BioNTech vaccines against Beta was later confirmed by several studies. On 1 April 2021, an update on a Pfizer/BioNTech South African vaccine trial stated that the vaccine was 100% effective so far (i.e., vaccinated participants saw no cases), with six of nine infections in the placebo control group being the Beta variant.

In January 2021, Johnson & Johnson, which held trials for its Janssen vaccine in South Africa, reported the level of protection against moderate to severe COVID-19 infection was 72% in the United States and 57% in South Africa.

On 6 February 2021, the Financial Times reported that provisional trial data from a study undertaken by South Africa's University of the Witwatersrand in conjunction with Oxford University demonstrated reduced efficacy of the Oxford–AstraZeneca COVID-19 vaccine against the variant. The study found that in a sample size of 2,000 the AZD1222 vaccine afforded only "minimal protection" in all but the most severe cases of COVID-19. On 7 February 2021, the Minister for Health for South Africa suspended the planned deployment of about a million doses of the vaccine whilst they examine the data and await advice on how to proceed.

In a study reported in March and May 2021, the efficacy of the Novavax vaccine (NVX-CoV2373) was tested in a preliminary randomized, placebo-controlled study involving 2684 participants who were negative for COVID at baseline testing. Beta was the predominant variant to occur, with post-hoc analysis indicating a vaccine efficacy of Novavax against Beta of 51.0% for HIV-negative participants.

Gamma (lineage P.1)

Limited evidence from various preliminary studies reviewed by the WHO have indicated likely retained efficacy/effectiveness against disease from Gamma with CoronaVac and Sinopharm BIBP, with no data for other vaccines yet. Relevant to how vaccines can end the pandemic by preventing asymptomatic infection, they have also indicated retained antibody neutralization against Gamma with Oxford–AstraZeneca and CoronaVac (no to minimal reduction) and slightly reduced neutralization with Pfizer–BioNTech and Moderna (minimal to moderate reduction), with no data for other vaccines yet.

The Gamma variant or lineage P.1 variant (also known as 20J/501Y.V3), initially identified in Brazil, seems to partially escape vaccination with the Pfizer-BioNTech vaccine.

Delta (lineage B.1.617.2)

Limited evidence from various preliminary studies reviewed by the WHO have indicated likely retained efficacy/effectiveness against disease from Delta with the Oxford–AstraZeneca vaccine and Pfizer–BioNTech, with no data for other vaccines yet. Relevant to how vaccines can end the pandemic by preventing asymptomatic infection, they have also indicated reduced antibody neutralization against Delta with single-dose Oxford–AstraZeneca (substantial reduction), Pfizer–BioNTech and Covaxin (modest to moderate reduction), with no data for other vaccines yet.

In October 2020, a new variant was discovered in India, which was named lineage B.1.617. There were very few detections until January 2021, but by April it had spread to at least 20 countries in all continents except Antarctica and South America. Mutations present in the spike protein in the B.1.617 lineage are associated with reduced antibody neutralization in laboratory experiments. The variant has frequently been referred to as a 'Double mutant', even though in this respect it is not unusual. the latter two of which may cause it to easily avoid antibodies. In an update on 15 April 2021, PHE designated lineage B.1.617 as a 'Variant under investigation', VUI-21APR-01. On 6 May 2021, Public Health England escalated lineage B.1.617.2 from a Variant Under Investigation to a Variant of Concern based on an assessment of transmissibility being at least equivalent to the Alpha variant.

Omicron (lineage BA.2 and BA.2.12.2)
COVID-19 vaccine effectiveness was studied in adults without immunocompromising conditions in 10 US states between December 18, 2021 – June 10, 2022, when Omicron was prevalent. 3 doses of mRNA COVID-19 vaccines was 69% against COVID-19–associated hospitalization 7–119 days after the third vaccine dose and 52% against COVID-19–associated hospitalization more than 4 months after the 3rd dose. Among adults aged ≥50 years, COVID-19 vaccine effectiveness against COVID-19–associated hospitalization ≥120 days after receipt of dose 3 was only 32%, increasing to 66% ≥7 days after the fourth dose.

Effect of neutralizing antibodies
One study found that the in vitro concentration (titer) of neutralizing antibodies elicited by a COVID-19 vaccine is a strong correlate of immune protection. The relationship between protection and neutralizing activity is nonlinear. Protection against infection quickly decays, leaving individuals susceptible to mild infections, while protection against severe disease is largely retained and much more durable. The observed half-life of neutralizing titers was 65 days for mRNA vaccines (Pfizer–BioNTech, Moderna) during the first 4 months, increasing to 108 days over 8 months. Greater initial efficacy against infection likely results in a higher level of protection against serious disease in the long term (beyond 10 years, as seen in other vaccines such as smallpox, measles, mumps, and rubella), although the authors acknowledge that their simulations consider only protection from neutralizing antibodies and ignore other immune protection mechanisms, such as cell-mediated immunity, which may be more durable. This observation also applies to efficacy against variants and is particularly significant for vaccines with a lower initial efficacy; for example, a 5-fold reduction in neutralization would indicate a reduction in initial efficacy from 95% to 77% against a specific variant, and from a lower efficacy of 70% to 32% against that variant. For the Oxford–AstraZeneca vaccine, the observed efficacy is below the predicted 95% confidence interval. It is higher for Sputnik V and the convalescent response, and is within the predicted interval for the other vaccines evaluated (Pfizer–BioNTech, Moderna, Janssen, CoronaVac, Covaxin, Novavax).

Side effects
All vaccines can have minor side effects related to the mild trauma associated with the introduction of a foreign substance into the body. These include soreness, redness, rash, and inflammation at the injection site. Other common side effects include fatigue, headache, myalgia (muscle pain), and arthralgia (joint pain) which generally resolve within a few days.

Serious adverse events that follow the administration of vaccines are of high interest to the public. It is important to recognize that the occurrence of an adverse event following vaccination does not necessarily mean that the vaccine caused the adverse event; the health problem may have been unrelated. Reporting of all adverse events, careful followup and statistical analysis of occurrences are required to determine whether or not a specific health problem is more likely to occur after a vaccine is administered.

More serious side effects are very rare. Before COVID-19 vaccines such as Moderna and Pfizer/BioNTech were authorized for use in the general population, they had to pass phase III studies involving tens of thousands of people. Any serious side effects that did not appear during that testing are likely to occur less often than ∼1 in 10,000 cases. It is important that Phase III trials be diverse, to ensure that safety results apply broadly. It is possible that side effects may affect a population that was not adequately represented during the initial testing. Pregnant women, immunocompromised people, and children are usually excluded from initial studies because they may be at higher risk. Further studies may be done to ensure their safety before vaccines are authorized for use in such populations. Subsequent examinations of the use of COVID vaccines in pregnant people and in children have shown similar outcomes to the general population and do not suggest greater risk for these groups.

References

 
Medical research